and  are songs by Japanese rock band Asian Kung-Fu Generation. Both songs were released as a double A-side and become their 27th single on 7 October 2020. "Furetai Tashikametai" features Moeka Shiotsuka of Hitsujibungaku as guest vocal. Both songs were recorded in RAK Studio, London during Hometown UK/FR Tour in 2019.

Release 
The single was released on 7 October 2020. It released in three editions total, a standard CD-only edition, and two limited editions that come with a T-shirt which feature illustrations by Yusuke Nakamura. The physical single contains song called "Next", composed by their bassist Takahiro Yamada and was produced in a remote environment.  Prior to the single's release, "Dialogue" and "Furetai Tashikametai" were premiered on Japanese radio, J-WAVE and InterFM897 respectively.

Track listing

Personnel
Adapted from the single liner notes.

Asian Kung-Fu Generation
 Masafumi Gotoh – vocals, guitars
 Kiyoshi Ijichi – drums
 Kensuke Kita – guitars, vocals
 Takahiro Yamada – bass guitar, synth bass, synthesizers vocals

Additional musicians
 Moeka Shiotsuka – vocals (track 2)
 Ryosuke Shimomura – synthesizers (track 1), synth bass arrange & soundmake (track 2)

Production
 Asian Kung-Fu Generation - recording (track 3)
 Isabel Gracefield – recording (track 1 & 2)
 Yosuke Inoue – engineering Kita's guitar (track 3) 
 Kenichi Koga –  mixing (track 3)
 Kenichi Nakamura – recording (track 1 & 2), mixing (track 1 & 2)
 Hiroshi Shiota - mastering

Artwork and design
 Yutaka Kimura – design
 Yusuke Nakamura – illustration

Charts

Release history

References 

Asian Kung-Fu Generation songs
2020 singles
Songs written by Masafumi Gotoh
2020 songs
Ki/oon Music singles